Laurel Valley Golf Club is a golf club located just south of the Pittsburgh suburb of Ligonier, Pennsylvania. Designed by Dick Wilson and renovated by Arnold Palmer, the Laurel Valley golf course opened in 1959. Since its opening, the club has hosted two notable tournaments: the 1965 PGA Championship and the 1975 Ryder Cup. Some other tournaments played there include the 1989 U.S. Senior Open, the 2001 Marconi Pennsylvania Classic and the 2005 Senior PGA Championship.

Laurel Valley was ranked the 5th best golf course in Pennsylvania by Golf Digest.

References

Golf clubs and courses in Pennsylvania
Buildings and structures in Westmoreland County, Pennsylvania
Ryder Cup venues
1959 establishments in Pennsylvania
Sports venues completed in 1959